Habib Muhamad bin Salim Alatas (born March 10, 1979) or also known as Habib Muhamad is an Indonesian politician who currently serves as a member of the Jakarta parliament (Jakarta Regional People's Representative Council) from the National Mandate Party.

References

Footnotes

Works cited

External links

 Profile at DPRD DKI Jakarta official website
 Profile at Tirto.id

1979 births
Living people
Indonesian people of Yemeni descent
National Mandate Party politicians
People from Jakarta
Jakarta Regional People's Representative Council members